Mark Ji Tianxiang was a Chinese lay Catholic and doctor. He was martyred during the Boxer Rebellion and had been an opium addict. He was canonized in 2000 by Pope John Paul II.

Early life and career 
Ji was born in Jizhou District, Hengshui, Zhili (now Hebei), China in 1834. He was a doctor and contracted a disease himself for the treatment of which he used opium, but instead of opium being a cure for him, he became heavily addicted to it. He was a pious Christian, always going to confession and mostly spending time in prayer, attending Mass, and providing free treatment to his patients. He made frequent confessions, but he was denied absolution and holy communion because the parish priest thought he lacked sorrow for his addiction since he couldn't overcome it. He didn't receive the sacrament for 30 years, but finally after 30 years of being a faithful and regular church goer, he was able to receive the sacraments.

Martyrdom 
On 7 July 1900, during the Boxer Rebellion, Ji and 119 other Christians were rounded up and asked to renounce Christianity, but they refused. Ji begged the rebels to kill him last so that he could encourage his family to die as martyrs and they wouldn't have to die alone. He didn't renounce his Catholic faith and hence was beheaded.

Canonization 
Mark Ji Tianxiang was beatified on 24 November 1946 by Pope Pius XII along with 120 other Chinese martyrs, including Augustine Zhao Rong, and canonized by Pope John Paul II on 1 October 2000.

References 

1834 births
Christian martyrs
1900 deaths
Chinese Roman Catholic saints